is an island in the municipality of Miura, Kanagawa Prefecture, Japan, off the southernmost and western tip of Miura Peninsula, facing Sagami Bay.

It is home to the Jōgashima Lighthouse, the fourth oldest western style lighthouse to be built in Japan. Jōgashima Park is located on the eastern part of the island.

Jōgashima is connected to the mainland by a box-girder bridge since 1959, which was the longest in Asia in 1963.

References

Populated coastal places in Japan
Islands of Kanagawa Prefecture
Miura, Kanagawa